Maura Therese Tierney (born February 3, 1965) is an American film, stage, and television actress. She is best known for her roles as Lisa Miller on the sitcom NewsRadio (1995–1999), Abby Lockhart on the medical drama ER (1999–2009), and Helen Solloway on the mystery drama The Affair (2014–2019), the last of which won her a Golden Globe Award for Best Supporting Actress – Series, Miniseries or Television Film.

Tierney appeared in numerous films, including Primal Fear (1996), Liar Liar (1997), Primary Colors (1998), Forces of Nature (1999), Insomnia (2002), Semi-Pro (2008), Baby Mama (2008), Beautiful Boy (2018), and The Report (2019).

Early life
Tierney was born and raised in the Hyde Park neighborhood of Boston, Massachusetts, the eldest of three children in an Irish American Catholic family. Her mother Pat (née James) is a real estate broker, while her father, the late Joseph M. Tierney, was a prominent Boston politician who served on the Boston City Council for 15 years.

Tierney attended Mount Alvernia Academy Elementary School and Notre Dame Academy in Hingham, Massachusetts, where she studied  drama, which led to her appearance at the Boston Globe Drama Festival. After graduation, she attended New York University, where she majored first in dance and then in drama.

Career
After appearing in several plays, Tierney moved to Los Angeles in 1987, earning her big break with a role in Disney's made-for-TV film Student Exchange. Tierney's first starring role in a film was in a low-budget independent film called Dead Women in Lingerie, which was shot in 24 days.

Tierney had a number of small roles in film and television and a co-starring role in 704 Hauser, a short-lived 1994 spin-off of All in the Family. She first received regular national exposure with her leading role in the sitcom NewsRadio from 1995 to 1999. While part of the NewsRadio cast, she also starred in several successful films of the late 1990s and early 2000s such as Primal Fear, Liar Liar, Primary Colors, Forces of Nature and Welcome to Mooseport.

After NewsRadio was canceled, Tierney decided not to star in another sitcom:

From 1999 to 2008, Tierney played Nurse Abigail "Abby" Lockhart on ER, a character that began as a guest appearance in November 1999 and then expanded in February 2000 to a full-time regular role as an ER nurse and later after completion of medical school, a doctor. She was reunited with her NewsRadio co-star Khandi Alexander, who at that time also had a recurring role on ER. Within a year, Tierney's work on ER earned her an Emmy Award nomination, a recognition she credits to a "juicy" story arc featuring Sally Field as Lockhart's mother Maggie Wyczenski, who has bipolar disorder.

Tierney confirmed in April 2008 that she would be leaving ER shortly after the beginning of the show's fifteenth season. In October 2008, she made her final regular appearance on the series after nearly 10 seasons on the show. She returned to make a cameo appearance in one additional episode later in 2009 toward the end of the final season.

Tierney's highest-profile film while being part of the ER cast was the 2002 film Insomnia, which was directed by Christopher Nolan. That same year, she also starred in Scotland, Pa. where she portrayed a Lady Macbeth-like character written specifically for her by Billy Morrissette, her husband at the time. She was praised by critics for her performance. She also collaborated with NewsRadio writer Joe Furey for a special "Working with Joe Furey" featurette for Furey's film Love and Support.

In 2004, Tierney won the second-season tournament of Bravo's Celebrity Poker Showdown against Lauren Graham, who had a guest role in the fourth season of NewsRadio. Tierney returned to the stage in May 2006 in an appearance opposite Eric McCormack in the Off Broadway premiere of Some Girl(s). She also appeared in the 2008 films Semi-Pro, Baby Mama, The Go-Getter and Finding Amanda. Tierney also played the role of Laurel in the Off Broadway play Three Changes with Dylan McDermott from September 16 to October 4, 2008.

Tierney returned to television, playing the recurring character Kelly McPhee on the FX series Rescue Me in 2009 and 2011 during its final season. She replaced Joely Richardson as the female lead of the 2010 ABC television series The Whole Truth after Richardson left to spend more time with her family. Tierney's role in the show, a legal drama produced by Jerry Bruckheimer, marked her return to television after recovering from breast surgery and cancer treatments. ABC canceled The Whole Truth after four episodes owing to low ratings.

In 2010, Tierney became a member of the New York City-based experimental theatre company The Wooster Group. She performed along with  Frances McDormand in the Wooster Group's 2010 remounting of North Atlantic, directed by Elizabeth LeCompte. From 2016 to 2019, she played the feminist Germaine Greer in  The Town Hall Affair, also directed by LeCompte. Tierney herself conceived the idea for this play, which recreates a raucous debate on Women's Liberation that Norman Mailer organized with prominent feminists in 1971.

In February 2011, Tierney made her debut at the Gate Theatre in the Dublin premiere of Yasmina Reza's God of Carnage (translation by Christopher Hampton) alongside Ardal O'Hanlon. Also in 2011, Tierney appeared in one episode of The Office (S8E9: "Mrs. California") as Robert California's wife.

In September 2012, Tierney began a recurring role on the CBS legal drama The Good Wife, playing Maddie Hayward. The role included scenes with the show's lead character Alicia Florrick, as played by Julianna Margulies; the two actors had previously worked together on ER, Margulies like Tierney having previously played a lead character on that show. In 2013, Tierney joined the cast of Showtime's The Affair, playing Helen Solloway, for which she won the Golden Globe Award in 2016.

In 2018, Tierney co-starred with Steve Carell and Timothée Chalamet in the dark family drama film Beautiful Boy, based on the memoir of the same name by David Sheff. In 2019, Tierney appeared in The Report as "an intense, driven, somewhat vengeful Counterterrorism expert determined to get behind any program that promises to get the intel that will stop another attack from happening."

In 2019, Tierney originated the lead role of Elizabeth in the West Coast premiere of Jen Silverman's play Witch at the Geffen Playhouse, directed by Marti Lyons.

In March 2020, Tierney joined the cast of Showtime's American Rust.

In October 2020, Tierney joined the cast of Showtime's Your Honor.

Personal life
In 1992, Tierney met actor-director Billy Morrissette, on the first day he arrived in Los Angeles, at the revolving lounge of the Hollywood Holiday Inn, and married on February 1, 1993, two days before her 28th birthday. Morrissette directed, and both Tierney and Morrissette appear, in the 2001 film Scotland, PA. She filed for divorce in 2006 due to irreconcilable differences. 

On February 1, 2009, Tierney officiated at the wedding of her friend and former ER co-star Parminder Nagra to photographer James Stenson.

Tierney had surgery to remove a tumor from her breast in 2009. She had been cast in Parenthood but schedule conflicts with her cancer treatments led her to leave and she was replaced by Lauren Graham. Tierney finished treatment and returned to work in a stage play in 2010.

In 2018, while riding her bike, Tierney was struck by a car and thrown to the ground. Although she was taken away in the ambulance wearing a neck brace, she was later released from the hospital with "no major injuries".

Filmography

Film

Television

Awards and nominations

References

External links

 
 
 
 
 

1965 births
20th-century American actresses
21st-century American actresses
American film actresses
American stage actresses
American television actresses
American people of Irish descent
Best Supporting Actress Golden Globe (television) winners
Circle in the Square Theatre School alumni
Living people
Tisch School of the Arts alumni
Actresses from Boston
Actresses from Massachusetts
People from Hyde Park, Boston